Perfil (In English: "Profile") is an album by Brazilian rock musician Cássia Eller released in 2003 by the label Som Livre in their profile series, containing hits like "Malandragem", "O Segundo Sol", "Palavras ao Vento", "Por Enquanto", "Milagreiro" (with Djavan), and "Nós", among others.

Track listing
"Malandragem"
"O Segundo Sol"
"E.C.T"
"Gatas Extraordinárias"
"Palavras ao Vento"
"Por Enquanto"
"Todo Amor Que Houver Nessa Vida"
"Nós" (live)
"Milagreiro" (with Djavan)
"Só se for a Dois"
"Juventude Transviada" (with Luiz Melodia)
"Na Cadência do Samba"
"Coroné Antonio Bento"
"Brasil"

References

2003 albums
Cássia Eller albums